Manuel Abramowicz (born 1967) is a far-left Belgian reporter, specialist of the far right.

He initially was a member of the youth wing of the Parti ouvrier socialiste (Socialist Workers Party), a trotskyist movement, currently known as the Revolutionary Communist League. Manuel Abramowicz was also associated with SOS Racisme-Belgium or the FGTB, a left-wing trade-union.

Since 1997, he is editor-in-chief of the ResistanceS online review, and also presides since 2002, the antifascist organization (asbl) RésistanceS - Centre d'études et de formation pour l’action démocratique. Abramowicz is a member of the "scientific council" of the non-academic Centre de recherche et d'études politiques.

Manuel Abramowicz has also co-realized some film documentaries, and is a founding member of the Mémoire & Politique organization. Abramowicz sieged at the head of the MRAX (Mouvement contre le racisme, l'antisémitisme et la xénophobie).

He is a frequent collaborator to several left-wing press organs, blogs or reviews: CeliuS (Franco-Belgian monthly on the far-right), Contradictions, Rue des Usines, Regards, Politique, Golias, Le journal des Juristes démocrates, Le Journal du Mardi, Espace de Liberté (monthly of the Centre d'action laïque), etc.

Bibliography
 Extrême droite et antisémitisme en Belgique de 1945 à nos jours, EVO, 1993 ;
 Les Rats noirs. L'extrême droite en Belgique francophone, Luc Pire, 1996 ;
 La Représentation électorale des partis d'extrême droite (with Wim Haelsterman), CRISP, 1997 ;
 Nakam (leftist novel written with Pierre Guyau-Genon), Ancre rouge, 1998 ;
 Guide des résistances à l'extrême droite, with a preface of Xavier Mabille, éditions Labor, 2005 ;
 Degrelle et ses disciples, Aden Belgique, 2009.

See also
Trotskyism
Antifascism

External links
Website of RésistanceS

References 

21st-century Belgian journalists
Male journalists
1967 births
Living people
Belgian politicians
Belgian bloggers
Belgian Trotskyists
Belgian documentary filmmakers